Serhiy Shestakov (born 12 April 1990) is a Ukrainian professional footballer who plays as a midfielder for LNZ Cherkasy.

Career
He played for the Ukrainian amateur football clubs, and then Shestakov spent time with some Ukrainian teams that played in the Ukrainian First League. But in July 2015 he signed a contract with the Ukrainian Premier League club FC Olimpik Donetsk. He made his debut for FC Olimpik as a substituted player in the game against FC Chornomorets Odesa on 18 July 2015 in the Ukrainian Premier League.

Personal life
He is a twin brother of another Ukrainian football player, Mykhaylo Shestakov.

References

External links

1990 births
Living people
Ukrainian footballers
People from Ladyzhyn
Association football midfielders
FC UkrAhroKom Holovkivka players
FC Dnister Ovidiopol players
FC SKAD-Yalpuh Bolhrad players
FC Nyva Ternopil players
FC Naftovyk-Ukrnafta Okhtyrka players
FC Olimpik Donetsk players
Diósgyőri VTK players
NK Veres Rivne players
Ukrainian Premier League players
Ukrainian First League players
Ukrainian expatriate footballers
Expatriate footballers in Hungary
Ukrainian expatriate sportspeople in Hungary
Twin sportspeople
Ukrainian twins
Sportspeople from Vinnytsia Oblast